Failure is a song by American rock band Sevendust from their fifth studio album Next. It was released as a single in 2006.

Song meaning
While everyone might think that the song's a downer, it's far from it. It actually conveys an enlightening message and encourages fans to look at the brighter side of life. "The message in it is really positive," explains guitarist Sonny Mayo. "It's about living life thinking you're gonna be a failure, and basing your whole existence on what other people or what another person told you about yourself, and finally coming out and realizing that it's all about inner strength and it doesn't matter what other people think about you. You could shed all the shame and all the guilt that you ever felt about things you did or things you didn't do, and you could truly find the positivity even if you always thought you were going to be a failure."

Chart Position
The song peaked #28 in the Mainstream Rock Chart Billboard 200.

Singles 

Billboard (North America)

Track listing

References

Sevendust songs
2005 songs
2006 singles
Songs written by Lajon Witherspoon
Songs written by John Connolly (musician)
Songs written by Morgan Rose
Songs written by Vinnie Hornsby